Liv Marie Austrem (born 30 January 1947) is a Norwegian novelist, children's writer and non-fiction writer.

Among her children's books are Runar vart 17 år from 1988 and Monas historie from 1993. She was awarded the Brage Prize in 1995 for Tvillingbror, shared with illustrator Akin Düzakin. In 1997 she received the Brage Prize for Tvillingsøster.

Among her novels are Gyda from 1995, and Rikkes reise from 1997.

References

1947 births
Living people
Norwegian children's writers
Norwegian non-fiction writers
Norwegian women non-fiction writers 
Norwegian women children's writers
Norwegian women novelists
20th-century Norwegian novelists
21st-century Norwegian novelists
20th-century Norwegian women writers
21st-century Norwegian women writers